The Show! Music Core Chart is a record chart on the South Korean MBC television music program Show! Music Core. Every week, the show awards the best-performing single on the chart in the country during its live broadcast.

As of  2023, 5 singles have reached number one on the chart, and 5 acts were awarded first-place trophies. "Roar" by The Boyz currently holds the highest score of the year, with 9,401 points on the March 4 broadcast.

Chart history

References 

2023 in South Korean music
2023 record charts
Lists of number-one songs in South Korea